A Ruff Guide is a compilation album by Tricky, with songs from the albums released during the Island Records period. It was released in 2002. Many of the songs feature vocals by Martina Topley-Bird.

Track listing

References

Tricky (musician) albums
2002 compilation albums
Island Records compilation albums
Compilation albums by English artists